Aradhana Misra (born 
20 April 1974), also known as Mona Misra, is an Indian politician and member of 18th Legislative Assembly of Uttar Pradesh. representing Rampur Khas of Pratapgarh district in  Uttar Pradesh as a member of Indian National Congress. She is the daughter of senior Congress leader and Member of Rajya Sabha Pramod Tiwari.

Education and background 
She received a Bachelor’s degree in commerce from Allahabad University in 1997 and completed Master of Business Administration. She is currently pursuing post-graduation in Human Rights from the Institute of Human Rights, Delhi.
Aradhana Misra alias Mona hails from a political background. Her father, Pramod Tiwari is a senior leader of Indian National Congress, who has been elected for nine times consecutive as MLA from Rampur Khas assembly constituency in Pratapgarh, and he is the Member of Rajya Sabha (upper house).

Political career 
Aradhana Misra is associated with Uttar Pradesh Congress Committee and is a member since 2000. She was earlier elected as Block Pramukh (chief) from Pratapgarh district of Uttar Pradesh for consecutive three terms, winning the elections 2001–2006, 2006–2011, and 2011 to 2016. She is a member of Uttar Pradesh state Monitoring and Vigilance Committee, MNEREA under the Ministry of Rural Development, Government of India. She was an active member of the Media Campaign Committee 2012 Uttar Pradesh election and had devised the media strategy for Congress party and Rahul Gandhi.

In the 2022 Uttar Pradesh Legislative assembly election Aradhana Mishra defeated her nearest BJP rival  by a margin of 14,741 votes from the Rampur Khas constituency in Pratapgarh district. This is her third consecutive victory as an MLA.

References

External links
 

1974 births
Living people
Uttar Pradesh politicians
Indian National Congress politicians
Uttar Pradesh MLAs 2017–2022
Uttar Pradesh MLAs 2022–2027